Ezhu Sundara Rathrikal is a 2013 Malayalam-language romantic comedy film directed by Lal Jose and starring Dileep, Parvathy Nambiar, Rima Kallingal and Murali Gopy. The film follows a sequence of events that unfolds during a course of seven days and nights of a bridegroom. It depicts how Aby Mathews (Dileep) life is tossed over when he happens to meet his ex-girlfriend once again before his wedding day.

Plot
Aby Mathew is an ad film-maker who is about to marry his model Ann. Aby throws a bachelors party for his bunch of friends viz. Abid, Franco, Daisy and a few others just seven days before the marriage. Through Abid, Aby learns of his ex-flame Sini's presence in the same city with whom he had a fall-out just a few days before their marriage. An inebriated Aby decides to go to Sini to invite her for his marriage. Sini talks high of her husband Alex, a boxer, with whom she has a son as well. Aby also boasts of his fiancée. During this meeting, Aby accidentally leaves his packet of cigarettes behind, which is then taken by Sini's son to school. On discovering the cigarette packet in school, the principal calls Sini and her husband for disciplinary action against their son. Sini however realizes that she cannot go to school with Alex since that would mean telling him about Aby's visit that day which she had kept as a secret from him. Sini therefore pleads to Aby to accompany her to school posing as her husband. Things take an ugly turn when they are seen together by a stranger.

Cast 

 Dileep as Aby Mathew
 Parvathy Nambiar as Ann, Aby Mathew's bride
 Rima Kallingal as Sini Alex, Aby Mathew's ex-girlfriend & Tyson Alex's wife / P.P. Ramani
 Murali Gopy as Tyson Alex
 Tini Tom as Franco
 Pavithra Menon as Anju (model) Franco's mistress
 Harishree Ashokan as Abid
 Suraj Venjaramoodu as Prem Raj
 Vijayaraghavan as City Police Commissioner Varghese
 Sreejith Ravi as Christy Perera
 Sreenivasan as himself
 Sreejith Vijay
 Sekhar Menon as Vivek
 Liimal G Padath as Aby's Friend
 Arun as Roy
 Ramu as Aby's father (Mathew) 
 Anil 'Scene Stealer' Rajgopal as Baijuraj
 Shiju as Alex's friend
 Majeed as Adv. George John
 Praveena as Dr. Daisy Franco
 Suja Menon as Vivek's wife
 Ambika Mohan as Aby Mathew's mother (Susanamma)
 Surabhi as Jayalakshmi
 Krishna Praba as Manjusha
 Deepika Mohan as Principal's wife 

Director Anoop Sathyan appears in a cameo role as a man trying to hook up with Sini ,while Sini is waiting for Alex in the restaurant. Anoop appears in the movie as he was working as an associate of Lal Jose in the movie at the time.

Production

Dileep was chosen to play the lead role of an Ad-filmmaker. It is the seventh film of Lal Jose with Dileep in lead role and the second with writer James Albert. The film was produced by Small Town Cinema.

Reception

The film received mixed reviews from the critics. Sify said "Ezhu Sundara Rathrikal gives you the feeling that there is a basic storyline here, which could have been fine as a feel good entertainer, if it was made well. In the current form, all that this confusion drama succeeds in is to leave you more confused". The Times of India rated the film 3/5 and said "Lal Jose intently tries to hold the complexities with a sense of triviality. He does away with tears and piano at times of grave emotional crises and would instead squeeze in cartoonish sequences. The light-hearted treatment works to an extent, but not for long as the narrative is crippled by a sluggishness that results from a poorly conceived script". Filmibeat wrote "There are some scenes where you can see the typical Lal Jose touch in the movie. But whether the director have fully succeeded to satisfy the viewers, it's a no. Still, Ezhu Sundara Rathrikal is a feel good movie which has its moments here and there" and rated 3/5.

Box office
The film was an average grosser at the box office. Ezhu Sundara Rathrikal received 5.6 crore as satellite rights from a Malayalam TV channel, a highest amount for a Malayalam film at that time.

Soundtrack

References

External links
 

2013 films
2010s Malayalam-language films
Indian romantic comedy films
Films directed by Lal Jose